Lucky Issy Idahor (born 30 August 1980 in Benin City) is a Nigerian football striker, who last played for FC Zorya Luhansk in Ukraine.

Career
He signed for Tavriya in January 2007, having previously played for FC Karpaty Lviv, Inter Baku and Vorskla Poltava. Idahor began his European career in 2000 with FC Dynamo Kyiv, for whom he played in the UEFA Champions League. Idahor scored winning goal for Tavriya in Ukrainian Cup final 2010 against Metalurh Donetsk.

Career statistics

References

External links

1980 births
Living people
Nigerian footballers
Nigerian expatriate footballers
Expatriate footballers in Azerbaijan
Expatriate footballers in Ukraine
Nigerian expatriate sportspeople in Azerbaijan
Nigerian expatriate sportspeople in Ukraine
Ukrainian Premier League players
Ukrainian First League players
Ukrainian Second League players
Azerbaijan Premier League players
FC Dynamo Kyiv players
FC Dynamo-2 Kyiv players
FC Dynamo-3 Kyiv players
SC Tavriya Simferopol players
FC Karpaty Lviv players
FC Vorskla Poltava players
FC Zorya Luhansk players
Shamakhi FK players
Sportspeople from Benin City
Plateau United F.C. players
Heartland F.C. players
Association football forwards
Nigeria international footballers